The 1945 Major League Baseball season featured 16 teams, eight in both the American League (AL) and National League (NL). The AL's Detroit Tigers defeated the NL's Chicago Cubs in the World Series, four games to three. It would prove to be the Cubs’ last appearance in a World Series until the 2016 World Series.

Awards and honors
The Sporting News Most Valuable Player Award went to Detroit Tigers third baseman Eddie Mayo; however, following a post-season vote, the official AL MVP Award was given to fellow Detroit Tiger Hal Newhouser, a pitcher. Newhouser ended the season with an ERA of 1.81, a record of 25 wins and 9 losses, and 212 strikeouts. Both of them helped lead the Detroit Tigers to a World Series win, and Newhouser remarked that Eddie Mayo was the driving force behind the 1945 pennant chase and that Mayo was a "take-charge kind of guy in our field."

The NL Most Valuable Player Award went to Chicago Cubs first baseman and outfielder Phil Cavarretta. He ended the season with an impressive batting average of .355 and an on-base-percentage of .455. The second-place finisher was Boston Braves player Tommy Holmes who finished the season with a batting average of .352 and an impressive slugging percentage of .577.

Hal Newhouser won the pitching Triple Crown in addition to the official AL MVP Award. To win this award you have to lead the league in wins, strikeouts, and ERA.

There was no hitter that was awarded the Triple Crown, which entails leading the league in batting average, home runs, and runs batted in.

There were nine players and one manager inducted into the Baseball Hall of Fame during the year 1945. The players were: Jim O'Rourke, King Kelly, Hughie Jennings, Hugh Duffy, Ed Delahanty, Jimmy Collins, Fred Clarke, Dan Brouthers, and Roger Bresnahan. Wilbert Robinson was the manager that was inducted in the Hall of Fame.

Statistical leaders

Standings

American League

National League

Postseason

Bracket

Managers

American League

National League

Home Field Attendance

Events

 On April 17, Pete Gray became the first (and so far, only) one-armed man to ever play in the Major Leagues.  He batted .218 in 77 games with the St. Louis Browns.
 This season would be the last World Series appearance for the Chicago Cubs until 2016.

See also
1945 All-American Girls Professional Baseball League season

References

External links
1945 Major League Baseball season schedule at Baseball Reference

 
Major League Baseball seasons